Castle Gardens may refer to:

Castle Gardens Petroglyph Site

See also
 Castle Clinton, formerly Castle Garden, New York